Brentwood High School is a secondary school in Brentwood, New York, United States. It is one of the largest high schools in New York State, and is in Suffolk County, Long Island. It is a part of the Brentwood Union Free School District.

History

1951–1970
The first class to graduate from Brentwood High School was the class of 1957. Before that, public school students in the district attended Bay Shore High School.

Brentwood High School began with the Ross Building, with its tennis courts and state-of-the-art swimming pool. 

In 1961, Eugene G. Hoyt, then the District Principal, and Raymond Scheele of Hofstra University presented a plan for curriculum development to Dr. Meade of the Ford Foundation. On the basis of this work, the foundation awarded Brentwood High School (with Hofstra as the "cooperating university") a grant of more than $300,000 for curriculum development.

The Sonderling Building was completed and opened in September 1964. It was named for the then-President of the Board of Education, Edward Sonderling.

During the summer of 1968 (in compliance with the Architectural Barriers Act of 1968), temporary portable classrooms were constructed between the Ross and Sonderling Buildings, housing the language and health classes. The Guy di Pietro Building was later constructed between the two main buildings and named in honor of the late social studies department chair who became the Superintendent of Schools in 1973 and remained so until his death in 1985.

On January 11, 1968, then-Senator Robert F. Kennedy visited Brentwood High School and spoke to 800+ students, parents and faculty in the Sonderling auditorium. After giving a short address, he opened the floor to questions and asked his own questions of the audience.

1970–1980
On June 27, 1971, the last Brentwood senior class graduated together as one 1,400 body of students enjoying the now demolished Commack Arena as the commencement site. 

By June 1973 the separation between BHS Ross and BHS Sonderling was complete. The class of 1973 had two separate graduations; Ross building was at 1pm, and Sonderling was at 5pm. The total graduating class from 1973 was about 1,200 students. The commencement ceremonies were held on the athletic field on June 23, 1973. From 1974 to 1989, the student body was large enough that the two primary buildings, Ross and Sonderling, were treated as two distinct high schools. Students from North Middle School and West Middle School went to Sonderling, while students from East Middle School and South Middle School went to Ross.

Brentwood High School was the site of the Maslow-Toffler School of Futuristic Education, an alternative high school, from 1974 to 1983.

WXBA's first general manager was Long Island radio personality Bob Ottone, the future public address announcer for the Long Island Ducks. The initial output of WXBA was ten watts, which meant that the signal barely made it three miles from the school under some conditions. It was upgraded in 1981 to 180 watts.

Brentwood High School established an Air Force Junior Reserve Officers' Training Corps (AFJROTC) in 1977. As of 2006, it was one of only two Long Island high schools to offer the program.

The Associated Press reported in 1980 that a week after Principal Stanley P. Yankowski instructed homeroom teachers to take down the names of students who did not stand for the daily recitation of the Pledge of Allegiance, the practice was stopped after a teacher complained to the New York Civil Liberties Union.

1981–1990
WXBA moved to expanded facilities in the newly built G. Guy DiPietro Learning Center during the 1988-89 school year.

The Brentwood Science Olympiad team competed in the New York State Science Olympiad tournament at West Point on April 16, 1988. According to Newsday, the team "finished second in Suffolk County, third on Long Island and 13th out of 147 schools in the State of New York."

In 1988, Brentwood's AFJROTC unit was named an honor unit by the U.S. Air Force. "Only the top 20 percent of all units in the nation are considered for recognition as honor unit. In addition, Lt. Col. Arthur Bennett and Master Sgt. James Waide have been named outstanding instructors," according to Newsday.

Newsday awarded Brentwood High School the High School of the Year Award in 1989.

1991–2000
In 1991, a plaque was hung listing military personnel who hailed from Brentwood.

In 1999, 56 solar panels were installed on the Ross Building.

2001–present
In 2004, The New York Times reported that Brentwood would be one of four Long Island school districts (the others being Hempstead, Lawrence and Manhasset) to be audited by the state comptroller in the wake of charges of theft made against school administration officials in Roslyn.

On Veterans Day in 2005, Newsday covered the dedication of a memorial to 15 graduates of the high school who had died during the Vietnam War.

On December 5, 2009, the Green Machine Marching Band represented Brentwood in C.W. Post's production of "Babes in Toyland" at the Tilles Center in Brookville, New York.
 
On October 28, 2012, the Green Machine Marching band took second place at the Syracuse Carrier dome in the division Large School II with a score of 89.05, performing its program "Conflict Without Resolution". It was beaten by Bville, with a score of 89.15.

On October 27, 2013, the Green Machine Marching band performed its first show in the National Division, being the only high school on Long Island to be included in the division. It performed its show "The Blue Hour" and came in 5th place out of 8 with a score of 90.85, a personal best for the band.

On November 1 of 2015, the Green Machine Marching band performed its program "The Glory of Rome" at the Syracuse Carrier dome in the National class and came in 5th place out of 8, with a score of 92.55, the current record for the National Class Long Island band.

School information

Brentwood High School is among the 19 elementary and secondary schools in the Brentwood Union Free School District in Suffolk, New York. The school educates students from grades 10-12 (9th graders attend the Brentwood Freshman Center) and also has adult continuing education programs. According to city-data.com, the school has a total of 3,532 students: 1,371 in 10th grade, 991 in 11th grade, 806 in 12th grade, and 275 from adult continuing education.

The school has two auditoriums, two gymnasiums, and six cafeterias. It is divided into three centers, Ross center, Sonderling center, and Guy Di Pietro learning center. Students who came from East or South middle schools are assigned under the Ross center, and students who came from West and North middle schools are assigned under the Sonderling center, although students attend classes in both buildings as well as with students of either building. The Guy Di Pietro learning center holds art and music classes. It also has a weight room, a gym, and a lecture center.

When the middle schools were opened, they were known as junior high schools.

Sports
 Baseball (boys' varsity/JV, girls' varsity/JV)
 Basketball - boys' Class AA Long Island Champions (2004, 2014, 2015)
 Cheerleading
 Fencing team (boys', girls')
 Football (boys' varsity/JV)
 Lacrosse - Frank Urso, All-American, Class of 1972, after high school played at the University of Maryland and is in the hall of fame, helping the team win its second NCAA Championship in 1975.
 Soccer - boys' varsity New York State Class A Champions 1958, 1989, 2008, 2010(undefeated), 2019(undefeated)
 Softball - New York State Class A Champions, 2009
 Tennis (boys' varsity/JV, girls' varsity/JV)
 Winter track (boys' and girls')
 Spring track (boys' and girls')
 Volleyball (girls' varsity/JV)
 Wrestling (boys' varsity/JV/youth)
 Swimming (boys' varsity, girls' varsity)
Marching Band

Notable alumni

1960–1981
 Reggie Fils-Aime, President and Chief Operating Officer of Nintendo of America (2006-2019) (graduated in 1979)
 Robert Gallucci, former US Ambassador at Large (1994–1996); dean of the Edmund A. Walsh School of Foreign Service, Georgetown University (graduated in 1962)
 Larry Hoppen, founding member of the band Orleans (graduated in 1966)
 Mitch Kupchak, former basketball player; former general manager of the Los Angeles Lakers (graduated in 1972)
Jef Raskin (Jeffrey Frank Raskin, died Feb. 2005), computer scientist (graduated 1960)
 Jack Scalia, actor (graduated in 1969)
 Leonard H. Tower Jr., a founder of the Free Software Foundation (graduated in 1967)
 Frank Urso, member of the Long Island Metropolitan Lacrosse Hall of Fame and National Lacrosse Hall of Fame  (graduated in 1979)

1981–2000
Gary Brown, former NFL offensive tackle (graduated in 1989)
Craig Mack, rapper (graduated in 1988, died 2018)
Biz Markie, rapper (died 2021);
James "Buddy" McGirt, boxer (graduated in 1982)
 Richard Migliore, jockey, (graduated via correspondence course in 1981)
Thomas Piccirilli, author (graduated in 1983, died 2015)
Jai Rodriguez, member of Queer Eye (graduated in 1997)
Rahadyan Sastrowardoyo, staff editor of The New York Times (graduated in 1981)
Erick Sermon, rapper; also performed as part of the group EPMD
Parrish Smith, rapper; also performed as part of the group EPMD

See also
 Maslow-Toffler School of Futuristic Education

Notes

External links
 Official site
 1964 Brentwood yearbook photos

Public high schools in New York (state)
Islip (town), New York
 
Schools in Suffolk County, New York
1957 establishments in New York (state)